In human anatomy, the greater pancreatic artery (great pancreatic artery or arteria pancreatica magna), is the largest artery that supplies the pancreas. It arises from the splenic artery.

Clinical relevance
Rarely, the greater pancreatic artery can rupture as a complication of chronic pancreatitis; this is often fatal.

See also
 Upper gastrointestinal bleed
 Pancreatic branches of splenic artery

References

External links
 

Arteries of the abdomen